Prema Pichollu is a 1983 Telugu-language film directed by A. Kodandarami Reddy. The film stars Chiranjeevi and Radhika with Kavitha, Gummadi, Rao Gopal Rao and Allu Rama Lingaiah in supporting comic roles. The movie is partly inspired by Basu Chatterjee's Shaukeen.

Plot 
Chiranjeevi plays Ravi, who is an unemployed post-graduate and in love with Prema (Radhika). Prema is a dancer in a local bar and attracts her boss Allu Ramalingayya and his friends Simham (Rao gopal Rao) and Gummadi. 3 old friends meet in Vizag and plan to trap Prema. Ravi manages to get a job at their place as a driver, without revealing his identity. He takes the help of Gummadi's son. Ravi and Prema use this opportunity of living at same place and get much closer. Three old men plan traps for Prema and each boasts about how efficiently they trapped her, when other two were away in their car with Ravi. A drunkard takes photos of theirs in compromising conditions and Ravi misunderstands Prema in this issue. Later three old men realize how their behaviour has affected a young couple's love, feel ashamed of their behaviour and reveal the truth to Ravi and unite them. Ravi is offered a job in Gummadi's factory, Prema a permanent job in Allu's hotel, and a house by Simham. Comedy generated by 3 old men is hilarious, especially when they describe the episodes when each narrates how he handled Prema.

Cast 
ChiranjeeviRadhikaKavithaGummadiRao Gopal RaoAllu Rama Lingaiah

Soundtrack

 "Chali Chaliga" -
 "Donga Raraa" -
"E Muddabanthi" -
"Gal Gal" -
"O Batasari" -

External links

1983 films
Films directed by A. Kodandarami Reddy
1980s Telugu-language films
Films scored by K. Chakravarthy
Telugu remakes of Hindi films